Shorta Aleppo Sports Club is a Syrian football club based in Aleppo. They play their home games at the Aleppo 7 April Stadium. Shorta Aleppo played in the Syrian Premier League twice, in the 1998–1999 and 2000–2001 seasons.

References

Shorta Aleppo
Sport in Aleppo